is a Japanese political activist of the Liberal Democratic Party of Japan, a former member of House of Representatives in the Diet (national legislature).

Profile and career
A native of Ōme, Tokyo and graduate of Waseda University Faculty of Education, Nishikawa was elected for the first time in 2000.

Her husband Hiroshi Nishikawa, a banker, is a mayor in Ashikita District, Kumamoto Prefecture.

Her profile on the LDP website:
Director, Committee on Health, Labour and Welfare
Member, Commission on the Constitution
Director, Special Committee on Consumer Affairs
Deputy Chairman, Policy Research Council of LDP

Ideology

Kyoko Nishikawa, a former Lower House member of the ruling Liberal Democratic Party who served as senior vice education minister, said to the effect that Japan waged the war to help all the nations of Asia prosper and gain independence. 

Nishikawa is affiliated to the openly revisionist lobby Nippon Kaigi, and a member of several right-wing Diet groups:
Secretary General, Diet Members to Discuss Japanese Future and History Education (日本の前途と歴史教育を考える議員の会)
Deputy Secretary General, Nippon Kaigi Diet discussion group (日本会議国会議員懇談会 - Nippon kaigi kokkai giin kondankai)
Pro-Yasukuni Alliance (みんなで靖国神社に参拝する国会議員の会)
Conference of young parliamentarians supporting the idea that the Yasukuni Shrine is a true national interest and desire for peace (平和を願い真の国益を考え靖国神社参拝を支持する若手国会議員の会)
Alliance of Diet Members for Acting Toward the Fast Rescue of Japanese Victims Kidnapped by North Korea (北朝鮮に拉致された日本人を早期に救出するために行動する議員連盟 - Kita Chousen ni rachi sareta Nipponjin wo souki kyuushutsu suru tame ni koudou suru giin renmei)
Japan Rebirth (創生「日本」- Sosei Nippon)
Parliamentarians acting to protect the Japanese territory (日本の領土を守るため行動する議員連盟)

Nishikawa is also a member of the Japan Buddhist Federation (全日本仏教会).

In 2013, Nishikawa referred to sexual slavery for the Imperial military ('Comfort women') as "mere prostitution".

Nishikawa gave the following answers to the questionnaire submitted by Mainichi to parliamentarians in 2014:
in favor of the revision of the Article 9 of the Japanese Constitution
in favor of the right of collective self-defense
in favor of nuclear plants
no problem for visits of a Prime Minister to the controversial Yasukuni Shrine
in favor of the revision of the Murayama Statement
in favor of the revision of the Kono Statement
against laws preventing hate speech
considers Marine Corps Air Station Futenma is a burden for Okinawa
in favor of the Special Secrecy Law
in favor of teaching 'morality' in school

References

External links 
 Official website in Japanese

Living people
1945 births
People from Ōme, Tokyo
Female members of the House of Representatives (Japan)
Members of the House of Representatives (Japan)
Members of Nippon Kaigi
Democratic Party of Japan politicians
21st-century Japanese politicians
21st-century Japanese women politicians